MV Port Fairy was a UK merchant vessel  built in 1928 by Swan Hunter for the Commonwealth & Dominion Line Ltd (or "Port Line") shipping company and sold in 1965 to Embajada Compania Naviera SA of Piraeus. Named after the coastal town of Port Fairy in Australia, she was renamed Taishikan for her final commercial voyage to Hong Kong where she was scrapped.

Career

Construction
Port Fairy, 8072 GRT, was built by Swan, Hunter & Wigham Richardson at Wallsend in 1928.

Pre-War
In 1930 her refrigeration equipment was modified and she carried the first cargo of chilled meat (instead of frozen meat) from Australia; she later worked the same cargo from New Zealand.

World War II
Port Fairy had an eventful war employed as an ammunition ship.

Margaree sank quickly; her captain, four officers and 136 crew were lost. Port Fairy rescued 34 of the survivors.

On 9 July 1943 the small Convoy Faith, comprising Port Fairy, the troopships Duchess of York and California, with escorts Iroquois, Douglas and Moyola, sailed Greenock for Freetown, Sierra Leone. Two days later, when the convoy was about 300 miles west of Vigo, it was attacked by 3 Focke-Wulf Fw 200 aircraft of Kampfgeschwader 40 based at Merignac, near Bordeaux. The precision high-altitude bombing left both Duchess of York and California blazing.  Port Fairy picked up 64 RAF survivors from Duchess of York. Both Duchess of York and California were abandoned, and in the early hours of 12 July they were sunk by torpedoes from their escorts as it was feared the flames from the ships would attract U-boats.

Towards the end of the attack, the remnants of the convoy were joined by the British frigate Swale which had sailed Gibraltar two days earlier for a scheduled rendezvous. Port Fairy was detached to Casablanca with Swale as escort shortly after midnight, for fear of further attacks. Nevertheless, the two ships were attacked the following evening by two Fw 200s returning from a reconnaissance mission. Despite the interception of the two bombers by two US Navy PBY Catalinas which strafed and badly damaged one of them  Port Fairy was hit on the port quarter by a 50 kg bomb which breached the hull, started a fire, and disabled her steering. Ammunition in adjacent cargo spaces was jettisoned and compartments flooded to minimize the risk of explosion. A bucket chain was set up to douse the fire, meanwhile Swale came alongside and played her own hoses on the blaze, which was extinguished by 2300 hrs. After two more air attacks, during which no further hits were sustained, both ships completed the remaining 500 nm to Casablanca without incident, Port Fairy steering by her engines.

Post-War
On 25 December 1953, while operating on the Montreal - Australian New Zealand service, both engines failed owing to contaminated lubrication oil and the ship drifted for three days towards the rocks of Fatu Hira atoll. Plans were put in place to rig a temporary sail, but as this was being done one of the engines was repaired and the ship made port at 5 knots.

Disposal
By 1965 Port Fairy was the oldest ship in the fleet, and was sold for £126,000 for scrap to Embajada Compania Naviera SA of Piraeus. Renamed Taishikan, she made her final commercial voyage to Hong Kong, where she was broken up.

References

External links
MNA Website - Red Duster.co.uk

Merchant ships of the United Kingdom
World War II merchant ships of the United Kingdom
1928 ships
Ships built by Swan Hunter
Ships built on the River Tyne
Maritime incidents in October 1940